Dragoslav Jovanović may refer to:

Dragoslav Jovanović (academic) (1886–1939), rector of the University of Belgrade from 1936 to 1939
Dragoslav Jovanović (Serbian politician, born 1937), Deputy Prime Minister of Serbia from 1993 to 1994
Dragoslav Jovanović (Serbian politician, born 1951), parliamentarian from 2004 to 2006